The Postal Services Act 2011 is an Act of the Parliament of the United Kingdom. The Act enabled the British Government to sell shares in Royal Mail to private investors and includes the possible mutualisation of the Post Office.

The Act allows private buyers to own up to 90% of Royal Mail, with Royal Mail staff being offered at least 10% of the shares of the company. It enabled the Post Office business to be separated from Royal Mail, to allow it to remain in government ownership or to be mutualised. It provided for the government to take over the assets and liabilities of the Royal Mail pension scheme, which had a considerable deficit. It allowed for the transfer of regulatory responsibility from Postcomm to the communications regulator Ofcom. The Act also wrote into law the requirement for Royal Mail to maintain a six day a week universal service.

During its passage through the House of Commons, the government added an amendment to include a guarantee that a silhouette or portrait of The Queen's head would remain on British postage stamps even if the Royal Mail were to be taken into foreign ownership. Following this stage it was considered by the House of Lords, and the government added further amendments to safeguard the universal service.

The Act was granted Royal Assent on 13 June 2011 and the majority of its provisions came into force on 1 October 2011.

Summary of main provisions
 The Postal Services Act 2011 received Royal Assent on 13 June 2011. It provides, amongst other things, for the responsibility for regulation for postal services to move from the existing regulator, Postcomm, to Ofcom.
 As part of the transition, there are a number of things which Ofcom either must do, or has the discretionary power to do. It also replaces the existing licensing regime with a general authorisation regime. The general authorisation regime came into effect on 1 October 2011.
 Ofcom may provisionally designate a universal service provider.
 Ofcom may approve a consumer redress scheme and require postal operators to be a member of that scheme.
 Ofcom must, in effect, transpose the existing licence conditions into initial conditions to apply under the general authorisation, including, as appropriate, consumer protection conditions.
 Ofcom may prepare a statement of the principles that it proposed to apply in fixing administrative charges;
 Ofcom must prepare and publish a statement of policy on information gathering for that year.

References

External links
Postal Services Bill – official page on UK Parliament website

United Kingdom Acts of Parliament 2011
Privatisation in the United Kingdom
Postal system of the United Kingdom
Royal Mail